Oklahoma State Cowboys   

Mark Kenery Muñoz (born February 9, 1978) is a Filipino-American former professional mixed martial artist who last competed in the Middleweight division of the Ultimate Fighting Championship. A professional competitor from 2007 until 2015, Munoz also formerly competed for the WEC. Throughout his career, Munoz was credited as one of "the nicest guys in MMA" even being officially ranked as No.1 during an Episode of "UFC Tonight" due to his contributions to both the sport of MMA, and his local community through activities such as starting up and running his own gym, and heading his own "anti-bullying" campaign.

Background

Muñoz was born on United States Fleet Activities Yokosuka, a United States Navy base in Yokosuka, Japan, to Filipino parents. At the age of two, Muñoz and his family relocated to Vallejo, California. Muñoz began wrestling at the age of 13 and also played football, but had to give up the latter sport when he was a sophomore in high school due to an injury. Because of his size and raw talent, Muñoz began wrestling with the varsity team at Vallejo High School. At Vallejo, Muñoz went on to be a two-time State Champion, an Asics First Team All-American, a 1995 National High School Champion, and the 1996 NHSCA National High School Champion. Muñoz was also on the honor roll for all four years and a member of the National Honors Society. That same year, Muñoz won a silver medal for the USA Junior National Team and finished fifth in his weight class at the FILA Junior World Wrestling Championship. Muñoz went on to compete at Oklahoma State University, where he compiled 121 wins overall, was a two-time All-American, and won an NCAA National Championship in 2001 as a senior. Muñoz was also a three-year member of the FILA Junior World Wrestling Team, earning the silver medal in 1998. Muñoz received a Bachelor of Science degree in Health Science from Oklahoma State University, and was also a three-time member of the NWCA All-Academic Team. After finishing college, Muñoz came back to be an assistant coach at Oklahoma State for two years, leading the team to an NCAA National Championship in 2003. Muñoz then began coaching at UC Davis, before transitioning into a career in mixed martial arts.

Mixed martial arts career

World Extreme Cagefighting
Muñoz made his WEC debut at WEC 34 on June 1, 2008, in the Arco Arena in Sacramento, California. Muñoz defeated Chuck Grigsby via KO (punches) at 4:15 of the first round.

Muñoz was slated to fight Steve Steinbeiss at WEC 36 on November 5, 2008, but due to an undisclosed reason he was replaced by TUF alum Alex Schoenauer.

Muñoz defeated Ricardo Barros on December 3, 2008 at the WEC's year-end event, WEC 37 via TKO (punches).

Ultimate Fighting Championship
Muñoz was one of the chosen few to be relocated to WEC's sister promotion—which is also owned and produced by Zuffa—along with WEC Light Heavyweight Champion Steve Cantwell, Light Heavyweight contenders Brian Stann and Steve Steinbeiss and Middleweight contenders Chael Sonnen and Nissen Osterneck.

On March 7, 2009, Muñoz made his UFC debut at UFC 96. Muñoz suffered the first loss of his career via knockout (head kick) from Matt Hamill during the first round.

On August 29, 2009, at UFC 102, Muñoz bounced back from his first defeat and answered the critics by winning a close split decision (28–29, 30–27 and 29–28) over fellow wrestler Nick Catone.

On January 2, 2010, at UFC 108, Muñoz faced and defeated MMA veteran Ryan Jensen via first round submission due to strikes at the 2:30 mark of the first round, showcasing some vicious ground and pound.

Muñoz defeated The Ultimate Fighter 3 winner Kendall Grove on April 10, 2010, at UFC 112, by referee stoppage in the 2nd round, also winning the Fight of the Night honors.

Muñoz was defeated by Yushin Okami via split decision on August 1, 2010, at UFC Live: Jones vs. Matyushenko. In this fight, Muñoz was unable to utilize his infamous ground and pound due to Okami's ability to defend his takedowns.

Muñoz won a unanimous decision over Aaron Simpson on November 20, 2010, at UFC 123.

Muñoz defeated TUF 7 finalist CB Dollaway at UFC Live: Sanchez vs. Kampmann on March 3, 2011, via first-round KO. Muñoz landed a right hand that floored Dollaway, where he then followed up with some ground and pound which secured him the victory.

Muñoz defeated Demian Maia via unanimous decision on June 11, 2011, at UFC 131.

Muñoz defeated Chris Leben, in the first 5-round non-title fight in UFC history, on November 5, 2011, by corner stoppage at UFC 138. The stoppage was due to the ground and pound of Muñoz that opened a cut over Leben's eye, rendering him unable to see and continue the fight.

Muñoz was set to fight Chael Sonnen on January 28, 2012, at UFC on Fox: Evans vs. Davis. However, Muñoz pulled out of his fight with Sonnen on January 17, 2012, due to an injury during training and was replaced by Michael Bisping, who was pulled from a scheduled fight with Demian Maia on the same card.

Returning to action, Muñoz instead faced Chris Weidman on July 11, 2012, in the main event at UFC on Fuel TV: Munoz vs. Weidman.  He lost the fight via KO in the second round. Munoz broke his foot in the course of the fight and was forced out of competition for a year.

Muñoz defeated Tim Boetsch via unanimous decision on July 6, 2013, at UFC 162.

Muñoz was expected to face Michael Bisping on October 26, 2013, at UFC Fight Night 30.  However, Bisping pulled out of the bout with an eye injury and was replaced by Lyoto Machida. Munoz lost the fight via knockout in the first round.

Muñoz faced Gegard Mousasi at UFC Fight Night: Munoz vs. Mousasi on May 31, 2014 He lost via rear-naked choke submission.

On June 12, 2014 Muñoz's new four-fight contract with UFC was announced.

Muñoz was very briefly scheduled to face Caio Magalhães on February 28, 2015, at UFC 184.  However, shortly after the bout was announced by the UFC, Magalhães indicated that he would not be able to compete at the event due to a lingering infection after recent dental surgery, which would require additional surgery.  Muñoz stayed on the card and eventually faced returning UFC veteran Roan Carneiro. He lost the fight via technical submission in the first round.

Muñoz faced Luke Barnatt on May 16, 2015, at UFC Fight Night 66.  Muñoz has indicated that win or lose, he expected this fight to be his last.  Munoz dominated the fight in the stand-up and ground, winning a unanimous decision (29-28, 30-27, 30-27). Keeping his promise, an emotional Munoz took off his gloves after the fight and placed them in the center of the octagon.

Personal life
Muñoz lives with his wife and his four children in Mission Viejo, California. Muñoz ran his own gym, Reign Training Center, in Lake Forest but in the end of April 2015, he sold it to an investor to dedicate more personal time to his children and as a wrestling coach. He was placed on administrative leave from his job as a high school wrestling coach at Fairmont Private Schools in Anaheim, California, in May 2022 amid allegations he encouraged students to settle their disputes with playground boxing matches. Muñoz issued a statement denying the allegations.

Acting career
Muñoz is acting as the main character of a 2020 film Lumpia with a Vengeance, in which he is also one of the co-producers.

Championships and accomplishments

Mixed martial arts
Ultimate Fighting Championship
Fight of the Night (One time)

Amateur wrestling
FILA Wrestling World Championships
FILA World Championships Junior Freestyle 178.5 1b - 5th place (1996)
FILA World Championships Junior Freestyle 182.5 1b - 2nd place (1998)
USA FILA Junior World Freestyle Championships
USA FILA Junior World Freestyle Championship 182.5 1b - Winner (1998)

Collegiate wrestling
National Collegiate Athletic Association
NCAA Division I All-American (2000, 2001)
NCAA Division I 197 1b - 3rd place out of Oklahoma State University (2000)
NCAA Division I 197 1b - Champion out of Oklahoma State University (2001)

Mixed martial arts record

|-
| Win
| align=center| 14–6
| Luke Barnatt
| Decision (unanimous) 
| UFC Fight Night: Edgar vs. Faber
| 
| align=center| 3
| align=center| 5:00
| Pasay, Philippines
| 
|-
| Loss
| align=center| 13–6
| Roan Carneiro
| Technical Submission (rear-naked choke)
| UFC 184
| 
| align=center| 1
| align=center| 1:40
| Los Angeles, California, United States
| 
|-
| Loss
| align=center| 13–5
| Gegard Mousasi
| Submission (rear-naked choke)
| UFC Fight Night: Muñoz vs. Mousasi
| 
| align=center| 1
| align=center| 3:57
| Berlin, Germany
| 
|-
| Loss
| align=center| 13–4
| Lyoto Machida
| KO (head kick)
| UFC Fight Night: Machida vs. Muñoz
| 
| align=center| 1
| align=center| 3:10
| Manchester, England
| 
|-
| Win
| align=center| 13–3
| Tim Boetsch
| Decision (unanimous)
| UFC 162
| 
| align=center| 3
| align=center| 5:00
| Las Vegas, Nevada, United States
| 
|-
| Loss
| align=center| 12–3
| Chris Weidman
| KO (elbow and punches)
| UFC on Fuel TV: Muñoz vs. Weidman
| 
| align=center| 2
| align=center| 1:37
| San Jose, California, United States
| 
|-
| Win
| align=center| 12–2
| Chris Leben
| TKO (corner stoppage)
| UFC 138
| 
| align=center| 2
| align=center| 5:00
| Birmingham, England
| 
|-
| Win
| align=center| 11–2
| Demian Maia
| Decision (unanimous)
| UFC 131
| 
| align=center| 3
| align=center| 5:00
| Vancouver, British Columbia, Canada
| 
|-
| Win
| align=center| 10–2
| C.B. Dollaway
| KO (punches)
| UFC Live: Sanchez vs. Kampmann
| 
| align=center| 1
| align=center| 0:54
| Louisville, Kentucky, United States
| 
|-
| Win
| align=center| 9–2
| Aaron Simpson
| Decision (unanimous)
| UFC 123
| 
| align=center| 3
| align=center| 5:00
| Auburn Hills, Michigan, United States
| 
|-
| Loss
| align=center| 8–2
| Yushin Okami
| Decision (split)
| UFC Live: Jones vs. Matyushenko
| 
| align=center| 3
| align=center| 5:00
| San Diego, California, United States
| 
|-
| Win
| align=center| 8–1
| Kendall Grove
| TKO (punches)
| UFC 112
| 
| align=center| 2
| align=center| 2:50
| Abu Dhabi, United Arab Emirates
| 
|-
| Win
| align=center| 7–1
| Ryan Jensen
| Submission (punches)
| UFC 108
| 
| align=center| 1
| align=center| 2:30
| Las Vegas, Nevada, United States
| 
|-
| Win
| align=center| 6–1
| Nick Catone
| Decision (split)
| UFC 102
| 
| align=center| 3
| align=center| 5:00
| Portland, Oregon, United States
| 
|-
| Loss
| align=center| 5–1
| Matt Hamill
| KO (head kick)
| UFC 96
| 
| align=center| 1
| align=center| 3:53
| Columbus, Ohio, United States
| 
|-
| Win
| align=center| 5–0
| Ricardo Barros
| TKO (punches)
| WEC 37: Torres vs. Tapia
| 
| align=center| 1
| align=center| 2:26
| Las Vegas, Nevada, United States
| 
|-
| Win
| align=center| 4–0
| Chuck Grigsby
| KO (punches)
| WEC 34: Faber vs. Pulver
| 
| align=center| 1
| align=center| 4:15
| Sacramento, California, United States
| 
|-
| Win
| align=center| 3–0
| Tony Rubalcava
| Decision (unanimous)
| PFC 4: Project Complete
| 
| align=center| 3
| align=center| 3:00
| Lemoore, California, United States
| 
|-
| Win
| align=center| 2–0
| Mike Pierce
| Decision (unanimous)
| Gladiator Challenge 69: Bad Intentions
| 
| align=center| 3
| align=center| 5:00
| Sacramento, California, United States
| 
|-
| Win
| align=center| 1–0
| Austin Achorn
| TKO (punches)
| PFC 3: Step Up
| 
| align=center| 1
| align=center| 1:25
| Lemoore, California, United States
|

NCAA record

! colspan="8"| NCAA Championships Matches
|-
!  Res.
!  Record
!  Opponent
!  Score
!  Date
!  Event
|-
! style=background:white colspan=6 |2001 NCAA Championships  at 197 lbs
|-
|Win
|12-5
|align=left|Pat Quirk
|style="font-size:88%"|5-3
|style="font-size:88%" rowspan=5|March 17, 2001
|style="font-size:88%" rowspan=5|2001 NCAA Division I Wrestling Championships
|-
|Win
|11-5
|align=left|Owen Elzen
|style="font-size:88%"|13-9
|-
|Win
|10-5
|align=left|Nick Preston
|style="font-size:88%"|4-3
|-
|Win
|9-5
|align=left|Brett Faustman
|style="font-size:88%"|Tech Fall 21-6
|-
|Win
|8-5
|align=left|Nik Fekete
|style="font-size:88%"|Major 14-6
|-
! style=background:white colspan=6 |2000 NCAA Championships  at 197 lbs
|-
|Win
|7-5
|align=left|Nick Preston
|style="font-size:88%"|OT 8-6
|style="font-size:88%" rowspan=4|March 18, 2000
|style="font-size:88%" rowspan=4|2000 NCAA Division I Wrestling Championships
|-
|Loss
|6-5
|align=left|Zach Thompson
|style="font-size:88%"|2-3
|-
|Win
|6-4
|align=left|Ross Thatcher
|style="font-size:88%"|OT 6-4
|-
|Win
|5-4
|align=left|Dan Bednar
|style="font-size:88%"|Major 13-5
|-
! style=background:white colspan=6 |1999 NCAA Championships at 184 lbs
|-
|Loss
|4-4
|align=left|Andy Hrovat
|style="font-size:88%"|OT 3-5
|style="font-size:88%" rowspan=5|March 19, 1999
|style="font-size:88%" rowspan=5|1999 NCAA Division I Wrestling Championships
|-
|Win
|4-3
|align=left|Ken Bigley
|style="font-size:88%"|8-1
|-
|Win
|3-3
|align=left|Scott Coleman
|style="font-size:88%"|12-7
|-
|Loss
|2-3
|align=left|Mike Greenfield
|style="font-size:88%"|4-8
|-
|Win
|2-2
|align=left|Nate Burroughs
|style="font-size:88%"|Fall
|-
! style=background:white colspan=6 |1998 NCAA Championships at 177 lbs
|-
|Loss
|1-2
|align=left|Jevon Herman
|style="font-size:88%"|5-6
|style="font-size:88%" rowspan=3|March 19, 1998
|style="font-size:88%" rowspan=3|1998 NCAA Division I Wrestling Championships
|-
|Loss
|1-1
|align=left|Vertus Jones
|style="font-size:88%"|Major 8-18
|-
|Win
|1-0
|align=left|Brian Bowles
|style="font-size:88%"|OT 7-5
|-

Filmography

Film

See also
 List of current UFC fighters
 List of male mixed martial artists

References
 :-

External links

Mark Munoz Profile at the National (Amateur) Wrestling Hall of Fame
UFC Profile
Mark Munoz Quotes

1978 births
Living people
Middleweight mixed martial artists
Light heavyweight mixed martial artists
Mixed martial artists utilizing collegiate wrestling
Mixed martial artists utilizing Muay Thai
Mixed martial artists utilizing Brazilian jiu-jitsu
Mixed martial artists from California
American practitioners of Brazilian jiu-jitsu
American Muay Thai practitioners
American male sport wrestlers
American male mixed martial artists
Filipino practitioners of Brazilian jiu-jitsu
Filipino Muay Thai practitioners
Filipino male sport wrestlers
People from Yokosuka, Kanagawa
Sportspeople from Vallejo, California
American mixed martial artists of Filipino descent
Ultimate Fighting Championship male fighters